Tasman most often refers to Abel Tasman (1603–1659), Dutch explorer.

Tasman may also refer to:

Animals and plants
 Tasman booby
 Tasman flax-lily
 Tasman parakeet (disambiguation)
 Tasman starling
 Tasman whale

People 
 Tasman (name), a name of Dutch origin, including a list of people with the name

Places

New Zealand
 Mount Tasman, in the Southern Alps of South Island
 Tasman Bay / Te Tai-o-Aorere, at the northern end of South Island
 Tasman Glacier, in the Southern Alps of South Island
 Tasman Lake, formed by recent melting and retreat of the Tasman Glacier
 Tasman Region, a region and a district of New Zealand in the north of South Island
 Tasman River, flowing from Tasman Lake and contributed to by other glacial rivers

Tasmania, Australia
 Tasman Fracture, an ocean trench southwest of Tasmania
 Tasman Island, an island off the southeast coast of the Tasman Peninsula
 Tasman National Park, at the south end of the Tasman Peninsula
 Tasman Outflow, an ocean current south of Tasmania that encircles Antarctica
 Tasman Peninsula, in southeast Tasmania

Other
 Tasman, Iran, a village in South Khorasan Province, Iran
 Tasman Rip, a marine channel in the South Shetland Islands, Antarctica
 Tasman Sea, between Australia and New Zealand

Politics and government
 Tasman (New Zealand electorate), an historic New Zealand Parliamentary electorate
 Tasman Accord
 Tasman Council, local government area of Tasmania

Sport
 Tasman Rugby Union, the governing body for rugby union in the north of South Island, New Zealand
 Tasman Series, 1964–1975, a motor racing series in Australia and New Zealand
 Trans Tasman Challenge, an annual yacht race between clubs in Australia and New Zealand
 Trans Tasman Cup, 2007–2012, an amateur golf tournament between Australia and New Zealand
 Tasman Cup, 1933–2016, an amateur women's golf tournament between Australia and New Zealand
 Trans-Tasman Cup, 1983–1995, an association football competition between Australia and New Zealand
 Trans-Tasman Trophy for cricket Test match series between Australia and New Zealand

Technology and commerce
 Tasman (layout engine), a discontinued layout engine developed by Microsoft for Internet Explorer
 Tasman Mill, a pulp and paper mill near Kawerau, north end of North Island, New Zealand
 Tasman Software, producers of Tasword, an early word processor for personal computers

Transport
 Tasman (VTA), a light rail station on Tasman Drive, San Jose, California, United States
 Tasman Bridge, Hobart, Tasmania
 Tasman Cargo Airlines, based in Sydney, Australia
 Tasman Empire Airways Limited (TEAL), 1940–1965, predecessor of Air New Zealand
 Tasman Highway (A3), an east coast highway in Tasmania between Launceston and Hobart

Other uses
 6594 Tasman, a main-belt asteroid

See also
 Tasmania, an island and state of Australia